Notogomphus kilimandjaricus is a species of dragonfly in the family Gomphidae. It is found in Kenya and Tanzania. Its natural habitats are dry savanna, moist savanna, subtropical or tropical dry shrubland, subtropical or tropical moist shrubland, and rivers.

References

Gomphidae
Taxonomy articles created by Polbot
Insects described in 1909